Pseudolueheia is a genus of worms belonging to the family Plagiorhynchidae.

The species of this genus are found in Malesia.

Species:

Pseudolueheia arunachalensis 
Pseudolueheia boreotis 
Pseudolueheia korathai 
Pseudolueheia pittae 
Pseudolueheia tongsoni

References

Plagiorhynchidae
Acanthocephala genera